Robert Barry Cleary (April 21, 1936 – September 16, 2015) was an American ice hockey player. Cleary was a member of the American 1960 Winter Olympics team that won the gold medal, teaming up as he did at Harvard with his brother Bill.  Bob was inducted into the United States Hockey Hall of Fame in 1981.

While at Harvard, the Cleary brothers played collegiate summer baseball together for the now defunct Sagamore Clouters of the Cape Cod Baseball League.

Awards and honors

References

External links
 
 United States Hockey Hall of Fame bio

1936 births
2015 deaths
American men's ice hockey centers
Bourne Braves players
Cape Cod Baseball League players (pre-modern era)
Harvard Crimson men's ice hockey players
Ice hockey players from Massachusetts
Ice hockey players at the 1960 Winter Olympics
Medalists at the 1960 Winter Olympics
Olympic gold medalists for the United States in ice hockey
United States Hockey Hall of Fame inductees
AHCA Division I men's ice hockey All-Americans